On May 28, 2008, shortly before 6:00p.m., two westbound MBTA trains collided on the Green Line D branch between Woodland and Waban stations, behind 56 Dorset Road in Newton, Massachusetts. An investigation by the National Transportation Safety Board (NTSB) originally found the cause of the accident to be due to the operator texting while driving, but the NTSB later found that the operator of the rear train, Terrese Edmonds, had not been using her cell phone at the time of the crash, but rather went into an episode of micro-sleep, causing her to lose awareness of her surroundings and miss potential hazards up ahead. The collision killed Edmonds, and numerous others were injured. Fourteen passengers were taken to area hospitals; one was airlifted. This crash, along with another similar accident a year later, led the NTSB to set higher standards and regulations regarding the use of cell phones while operating a train.

Background

The Green Line is a light rail system run by the Massachusetts Bay Transportation Authority (MBTA) in the Boston, Massachusetts, metropolitan area. It is the oldest subway line in the United States.  The Green Line splits into multiple branches; the D branch is a grade-separated, dual track line operating from a terminal station at Riverside to Kenmore station, where the D branch merges with the other Green Line branches and operates on shared tracks into downtown Boston.  The D branch" uses block signaling between Waban and Woodland stations; operating rules require that Green Line trains encountering a single red signal to hold for 1 minute, then proceed at no more than 10 miles per hour past the red signal while being prepared to stop short of any train or other obstruction.

Accident
The 2008 Massachusetts train collision occurred on the westbound track between Waban and Woodland stations.  Trains 3667 and 3681 were both Green Line trains operating in the westbound direction on the D branch at the time of the accident.  At approximately 5:50PM, Train 3681 departed Waban station, and passed signal H-64. Signal H-64 changed to display a single red aspect, to indicate that Train 3681 was directly ahead of it. Train 3681 then encountered a single red signal at H-66, and came to a stop.  Per operating rules, Train 3681 held at signal H-66 for 1 minute, then began to operate past H-66 at a restricted speed, reaching a speed of 3.4 mph at the time of the accident.

Train 3667 departed Waban station westbound behind Train 3681.  Although the red signal at H-64 required Train 3667 to stop and hold for 1 minute, an MBTA employee on the rear of Train 3667 told the NTSB that the train never slowed down after departing Waban, and instead accelerated to the maximum authorized speed of 40 mph. Travelling at a speed of 38 mph, Train 3667 crashed into the rear of Train 3681. The front of the lead car of Train 3667 suffered extensive damage, crushing the operating cab.  The operator of Train 3667, Terrese Edmonds, suffered blunt force trauma during the collision and was killed; 8 passengers were injured.

Investigation
Initially, operator error was blamed for the crash. As the investigation began, the crash was suspected to be caused by distraction of Edmonds, who allegedly was using a cell phone while operating the train. However, the National Transportation Safety Board (NTSB) ruled out distraction after it obtained Edmonds' cell phone records and determined that her cell phone was not in use at the time of the crash. Investigators also found that the brakes had not been applied, and the tracks were not faulty.

The NTSB determined that an episode of micro-sleep caused by sleep apnea was likely the reason for the operator losing awareness of her environment. Edmonds was a relatively inexperienced operator who had tried for several years to get the job and was happy to have received it. The qualifications for the job included a high school diploma, a valid driver's license, a background check, and seven weeks of training.

Aftermath
In 2009, the NTSB released its final report on the crash. About a year later, another crash on the same route was blamed on an operator texting while driving.

See also

List of American railroad accidents
List of rail accidents (2000-2009)

Other similar accidents
 2016 Hoboken train crash, where the engineer also has been diagnosed with sleep apnea afterwards
 2016 Croydon tram derailment, another light rail crash caused by sleep apnea in the driver
 Bourne End rail crash, similar accident in postwar Britain where a sleep-challenged engineer may have momentarily lost attention and taken the train into a curve too fast
 December 2013 Spuyten Duyvil derailment, sleep apnea diagnosed in engineer afterwards blamed for his inattention at time of accident
 June 2009 Washington Metro train collision, similar accident in Washington, D.C. in which a stationary train was rear-ended by a train moving at just under full speed and the first car of the moving train telescoped over the last car of the stationary train.

Notes

References

External links

911 calls at time of crash

Massachusetts train collision
Train collision
Railway accidents and incidents in Massachusetts
Accidents and incidents involving Massachusetts Bay Transportation Authority
Newton, Massachusetts
History of Middlesex County, Massachusetts
Massachusetts train collision
Green Line (MBTA)